Bosc's fringe-toed lizard or Bosk's  fringe-fingered lizard (Acanthodactylus boskianus) is a species of lizard in the family Lacertidae. The species is endemic to North Africa and Western Asia. Three subspecies are sometimes recognised; A. boskianus boskianus, from Lower Egypt; A. boskianus euphraticus from Iraq; and A. boskianus asper from the rest of the range; however this division is unsatisfactory because each subspecies has much variation and the differences between them are not consistent.

Description
Males are usually larger than females. The feet have long slender digits which are fringed. The dorsal surface is olive-grey with five longitudinal dark stripes, the middle one of which subdivides at the neck. The ventral surface is whitish, but in the female, the underside of the tail becomes suffused with red during the breeding season. In juveniles, the tail is blue.

Distribution and habitat
A. boskianus is found in Algeria, Egypt, Eritrea, Ethiopia, Iran, Iraq, Israel, Jordan, Kuwait, Libya, Mali, Mauritania, Niger, Nigeria, Oman, Saudi Arabia, Sudan, Syria, southern Turkey, Tunisia, and the United Arab Emirates. It is one of the most common diurnal lizards over much of its range, and is found in a diversity of habitats, including coastal plains and cultivated areas, saltmarshes, oases and wadis, usually in areas with a light to moderate vegetation cover on sandy or gravelly substrates.

Behavior
Bosc's fringe-toed lizard is a fast-moving lizard and a very active forager. Males are territorial and larger males, with larger head sizes are more successful than smaller males. Size is important in females as well, with an average clutch size of four oviductal eggs, and a range of two to seven, the number of eggs being carried being largely dependent on abdominal capacity. Certain chemicals present in the skin and in the exudate from the femoral glands may play a role in chemical communication, sex recognition and courtship behaviour. A. boskianus is oviparous.

Gallery

Etymology
Both the specific name, boskianus, and the common name, Bosc's fringe-toed lizard, are in honor of French naturalist Louis Augustin Guillaume Bosc.

References

Further reading

 Boulenger GA (1887). Catalogue of the Lizards in the British Museum (Natural History). Second Edition. Volume III. Lacertidæ ... London: Trustees of the British Museum (Natural History). (Taylor and Francis, printers). xii + 575 pp. + Plates I-XL. (Acanthodactylus boskianus, pp. 59–60).
 Daudin FM (1802). Histoire Naturelle, générale et particulière des reptiles; Ouvrage faisant suite à l'Histoire Naturelle générale et particulière, composée par Leclerc de Buffon, et rédigée par C.S. Sonnini, membre de plusiers Sociétés savantes. Tome troisième [Volume 3]. Paris: F. Dufart. 452 pp. (Lacerta boskiana, new species, pp. 188–190). (in French and Latin).
 Salvador A (1982). "A revision of the lizards of the genus Acanthodactylus (Sauria: Lacertidae)". Bonner Zoologische Monographien (16): 1-167. (Acanthodactylus boskianus, pp. 23–37, Figures 4-6, Maps 2-5, Tables 1-5). (in English, with an abstract ig German).

Acanthodactylus
Lizards of Asia
Lacertid lizards of Africa
Reptiles of North Africa
Reptiles of West Africa
Reptiles of the Arabian Peninsula
Reptiles of the Middle East
Reptiles of Ethiopia
Reptiles of Iran
Reptiles of Iraq
Reptiles of Jordan
Reptiles of Nigeria
Reptiles of Syria
Reptiles of Turkey
Reptiles described in 1802
Taxa named by François Marie Daudin